Shruti Ramachandran is an Indian actress who predominantly appears in Malayalam cinema. She also co-wrote the "Ilamai Idho Idho" segment in the 2020 Tamil anthology film Putham Pudhu Kaalai. In 2020, she won the Kerala State Film Award for Best Dubbing Artist for her work in Kamala. In 2022, she won the Critic’s mention for best actress by the Kerala Film Critic’s Assocoiation for her work in Madhuram.

Career
She is best known for her role in the 2021 film Madhuram with Joju George , 2016 film Pretham with Jayasurya , 2017 film Sunday Holiday with Asif Ali and 2021 film, Kaanekkaane with Tovino She also played a supporting role as Jaya in the 2019 Telugu movie Dear Comrade. She also starred in the movie Anveshanam, alongside Jayasurya in 2019.

Along with her husband Francis Thomas, Shruti wrote the segment "Ilamai Idho Idho" for the anthology film Putham Pudhu Kaalai which released in 2020.

Shruti won the ‘Special Jury mention for Acting excellence’ by the Kerala State Critics Association for her performance in Madhuram
Shruti also won the Kerala State Film Awards for the best Dubbing artist in 2020 for the movie Kamala, directed by Ranjith Sankar.

Personal life
Shruti Ramchandran was born in Chennai, Tamil Nadu and later moved to Kochi, Kerala.

She did her montessori schooling at Lady Andal Venkatasubba Rao school, Chennai. She later went on to doing her primary to senior school education at The Choice School, Cochin.

Shruti is a trained architect who did her Bachelors in Architecture at The University School of Design, Mysore. Post her bachelors, she worked at architecture firms in Chennai and Bombay before doing her Masters in Self Sufficient Buildings from IAAC, Barcelona.

Shruti has also worked as a professor in an Architectural college in Cochin.

In 2016, married her longtime boyfriend, Francis Thomas.

Filmography

Actor

Web series

Television

Writer

References

External links

Living people
Indian film actresses
Actresses in Malayalam cinema
21st-century Indian actresses
Female models from Kerala
Actresses in Telugu cinema
Indian voice actresses
Year of birth missing (living people)